Chris Nwabueze Ngige (born 8 August 1952) is a Nigerian politician and medical doctor. He is the current Minister of Labour and Employment of Nigeria under President Muhammadu Buhari's administration. He was elected Senator for Anambra Central Constituency in April 2011. He was the governor of Anambra State in Nigeria from May 2003 to March 2006 under the People's Democratic Party (PDP).

Background

A medical doctor by profession, Ngige graduated from the University of Nigeria-Nsukka in 1979. Chris immediately went into the civil service, serving at the National Assembly and state house clinics at different times. He retired in 1998 as a deputy director in the Federal Ministry of Health.

Political career

Dr. Chris Nwabueze Ngige joined politics, becoming a member of the People's Democratic Party (PDP). In 1999, he was Assistant National Secretary and Zonal Secretary of the Peoples Democratic Party (PDP) in the South East region of Nigeria.

In 2003, he was elected governor of Anambra State in controversial circumstances. He quickly broke ranks with his political godfather, Chris Uba the  brother of Andy Uba, after an unsuccessful attempt on 10 July 2003 to have him removed from office, through a fabricated letter of resignation which the state assembly accepted. In August, 2005, an Election Tribunal led by Justice Nabaruma nullified Ngige's 2003 victory. He appealed to the Nigerian Federal Court of Appeal, but the annulment was confirmed on 15 March 2006, in a judgment awarding victory to Peter Obi of the All Progressives Grand Alliance (APGA). No further appeals were possible, and Ngige accepted the judgment in good faith, calling on the people of Anambra to give their support to his successor. 
Following Peter Obi's subsequent impeachment, Ngige attempted to participate in state governorship elections in April 2007, but was frustrated by the Independent National Electoral Commission and federal 'disqualification', even after a Federal High Court had voided the disqualification. In the final event, Obi's impeachment was overturned anyway, and Obi served out his four years. At the time, Ngige was also severely criticized for appearing naked at the dreaded Okija voodoo shrine during his campaign to be made governor.

On 6 February 2010, Ngige again contested for the governorship of Anambra State. Other notable politicians who contested with him included Andy Uba, Charles Soludo, Nicholas Ukachukwu, Mrs. Uche Ekwunife, Ralph Nwosu, and the incumbent governor, Peter Obi. In all, there were 25 candidates for that election. Peter Obi won that election and started his second term as the governor of Anambra State.

In April 2011, Ngige ran for election for senator of Anambra Central, on the Action Congress of Nigeria (ACN) platform. After voting problems in some areas of the constituency on 9 April, the election in these areas was held on 25 April and Ngige was declared the winner over former Minister of Information and Communications Professor Dora Akunyili of the APGA, with 69,765 votes to Akunyili's 69,292.

Ngige's tenure as a senator of the Federal Republic of Nigeria came to an end following his defeat in the 2015 election by Hon. Mrs Uche Ekwunife who has been sworn in as the senator representing Anambra Central Senatorial District in the current 8th National Assembly of Nigeria.

On 11 November 2015, Ngige was named minister of Labour and Employment by President Muhammadu Buhari. In 2019, Chris Ngige was Nominated by President Muhammadu Buhari as a returning minister for screening by the house of assembly. On 21 August 2019, he was sworn in by the president as the Minister of Labour and Employment

On 19 April 2022, Ngige declared interest to run for the post of the President of the Republic of Nigeria under the All Progressive Congress (APC) banner. The experienced politician, who has served as Governor of Anambra State, Senator and Minister described himself as "jack of all trade and masters of all"

See also
Cabinet of Nigeria
List of Governors of Anambra State

References

External links 
 Official Nuhu Ribadu for President campaign website

1952 births
Living people
Igbo politicians
Nigerian Roman Catholics
University of Nigeria alumni
Governors of Anambra State
Buhari administration personnel
Peoples Democratic Party state governors of Nigeria
Action Congress of Nigeria politicians
Members of the Senate (Nigeria)
All Progressives Congress politicians
Federal ministers of Nigeria
20th-century Nigerian medical doctors
21st-century Nigerian medical doctors